Fifth & West Residences is a 39-story residential skyscraper located at 501 West Ave. in Downtown Austin, Texas. Fifth & West is the fourth tallest all-residential tower in Austin, behind The Independent, The Austonian and 360 Condominiums. The building is located along a Capitol View Corridor, creating a unique triangular tower atop a square podium base. The tower is located in the Shoal Creek floodplain.

History 
Fifth & West started construction with almost a year of foundation-related delays. The small quarter-block site caused issues removing material from the underground parking garage excavation, and weather delays such as the 2015 Memorial Day Floods added to the delays. In June 2016, a city pollution charge was filed after inspectors discovered runoff being funneled into nearby Shoal Creek. After the tower's foundation reached ground level in November 2016, construction resumed the planned speed and finished in just over two years.

See also

List of tallest buildings in Austin, Texas
List of tallest buildings in Texas

References

External links

Residential skyscrapers in Austin, Texas
Residential condominiums in the United States
Residential buildings completed in 2018